Richard Harvey Chambers (November 7, 1906 – October 21, 1994) was a United States circuit judge of the United States Court of Appeals for the Ninth Circuit.

Education and career

Chambers was born to William Rock and Lida Chambers in Danville, Illinois. Three months later, the family moved to Solomonville, Arizona, where his father worked as clerk of the district court of Graham County. In 1924, Chambers graduated as class president from Safford High School in Safford, Arizona, and then earned a Bachelor of Arts degree in economics from the University of Arizona in 1929, where he served as editor-in-chief of the school newspaper. Chambers received a Bachelor of Laws from Stanford Law School in 1932. He practiced law in Tucson, Arizona from 1932 to 1942, and from 1945 to 1954. He served as a United States Army Air Corps Major from 1942 to 1945.

Federal judicial service

Chambers was nominated by President Dwight D. Eisenhower on April 6, 1954, to the United States Court of Appeals for the Ninth Circuit, to a new seat created by 68 Stat. 871. He was confirmed by the United States Senate on April 27, 1954, and received his commission on April 30, 1954. He served as Chief Judge and as a member of the Judicial Conference of the United States from 1959 to 1976, the longest-serving chief judge in the history of the Ninth Circuit and the "longest-tenured chief of any circuit, ever." He assumed senior status on December 31, 1976. His service was terminated on October 21, 1994, due to his death.

Honor and legacy

The United States Court of Appeals Building in Pasadena, California, bears his name; but four other historic courthouses in the Ninth Circuit—in San Francisco, Portland, Tacoma, and San Diego—also owe "their survival and resurrection" to Chambers' "vision and tenacity."

Personality

Chambers "had something of a coarse exterior" as well as a "slow, low, and deliberate speaking style" that he himself described as "halting speech." The gruff appearance only lightly concealed "a mischievous sense of humor." For instance, Chambers frequently wrote memoranda to his colleagues under the pseudonym, "Tom Chambers," the name of his palomino horse. Chambers dedicated himself to writing judicial prose that was succinct, folksy, even quirky, believing that in writing accessible decisions, his court could more effectively create legal precedent, provide popular accountability, and produce a usable historical record.

References

Further reading
 
 Caleb Langston, "Built to Last: Judge Richard H. Chambers and His Pasadena Courthouse," Western Legal History, 19 (2006), 3–25.
 Michael Eric Siegel, "Riding Tall in a Small Saddle: The Chief Judgeship of Richard H. Chambers, Western Legal History, 19 (2006), 27–53.
 Cynthia Holcomb Hall, "A Former Law Clerk Remembers," Western Legal History, 19 (2006), 55–57.
 Lee M. A. Simpson, "Preserving the Ninth Circuit," Western Legal History, 19 (2006), 59–88.
 Alfred T. Goodwin, "Judge Chambers Confers Sainthood: A Reminiscence," Western Legal History, 19 (2006), 89–90.
 Rebekah Heiser Hanley, "Matters of Style, Matters of Opinion: The Voice and Legacy of Richard Chambers, Western Legal History, 19 (2006), 91–122.

1906 births
1994 deaths
People from Danville, Illinois
Military personnel from Illinois
Judges of the United States Court of Appeals for the Ninth Circuit
United States court of appeals judges appointed by Dwight D. Eisenhower
20th-century American judges
People from Safford, Arizona
United States Army Air Forces officers